Menachem Cohen may refer to:
Menachem Cohen (politician) (1922–1975), Israeli politician
Menachem Cohen (scholar) (born 1928), Israeli scholar
Menachem Cohen (architect), Israeli architect who designed Tel Aviv City Hall